Jeong So-eun (born 5 April 1996) is a South Korean swimmer.

She represented South Korea at the 2019 Summer Universiade held in Naples, Italy. She won the bronze medal in the women's 50 metres butterfly event.

In 2019, she also represented South Korea at the World Aquatics Championships held in Gwangju, South Korea. She competed in the women's 50 metre freestyle and women's 100 metre freestyle events. In both events she did not advance to compete in the semi-finals. She also competed in two women's relay events and two mixed relay events, without winning a medal.

References 

Living people
1996 births
Place of birth missing (living people)
South Korean female butterfly swimmers
South Korean female freestyle swimmers
Universiade medalists in swimming
Universiade bronze medalists for South Korea
Medalists at the 2019 Summer Universiade
21st-century South Korean women